is a railway station in Higashi-ku, Hamamatsu,  Shizuoka Prefecture, Japan, operated by the private railway company, Enshū Railway.

Lines
Saginomiya Station is a station on the  Enshū Railway Line and is 6.6 kilometers from the starting point of the line at Shin-Hamamatsu Station.

Station layout
The station has one elevated island platform with the station building underneath. The station building has automated ticket machines, and automated turnstiles which accept the NicePass smart card, as well as ET Card, a magnetic card ticketing system. The station is staffed.

Platforms

Adjacent stations

|-
!colspan=5|Enshū Railway

Station history
Saginomiya Station was established on December 6, 1909.

Passenger statistics
In fiscal 2017, the station was used by an average of 1,138  passengers daily (boarding passengers only).

Surrounding area
The station is in a commercial suburb of Hamamatsu.

See also
 List of railway stations in Japan

References

External links

 Railway official website

Railway stations in Japan opened in 1909
Railway stations in Shizuoka Prefecture
Railway stations in Hamamatsu
Stations of Enshū Railway